Bristol Bus and Coach Station serves the city of Bristol in the west of England. It is situated on Marlborough Street, near the Broadmead shopping area. The original bus station and onsite depot were opened in 1958 by the Bristol Omnibus Company. It was later redeveloped with the current bus station opening in 2006.

Before 1958 Bristol had no bus station; most country and long-distance coach services departed from Prince Street, and others used street stops in the Centre, Canon's Road and Old Market.

The station is managed by First West of England. There are 19 bays, Bays 1 to 7 are for National Express long-distance coach services. Bays 8 to 19 are for local bus services to locations outside of Bristol.

Bristol Bus and Coach Station has many facilities including a First Bus Travelhub which offers information and ticket sales for First Bus services, a National Express Ticket Sales and Information Desk, National Express ticket machines, The Coffee Room cafe, 24-hour security and public toilets including an accessible toilet.

See also
Buses in Bristol

References

External links
MisterWhat.co.uk Bristol Bus Station
Qype.co.uk Bristol Bus Station

Buildings and structures in Bristol
Bus stations in England
Bus transport in Bristol
Transport infrastructure completed in 1958
1958 establishments in England